William Dongan, 1st Earl of Limerick (1630 – 1698) was an Irish Jacobite soldier and peer.

Dongan was the second son of Sir John Dongan, 2nd Baronet and Mary Talbot, daughter of Sir William Talbot, 1st Baronet. His older brother, Sir Walter Dongan, 3rd Baronet, was involved in the Irish Rebellion of 1641. Dongan was declared innocent of any involvement in the rebellion and was in the service of Charles II of England during his exile. Following the Stuart Restoration, Dongan was restored to his lands and created Viscount Dungan in the Peerage of Ireland in 1661, and took his seat in the Irish House of Lords. He succeeded Walter as baronet in February 1662. In January 1686 he was created Earl of Limerick, also in the Peerage of Ireland. In May 1686 he was made a member of the Privy Council of Ireland.

In 1689 he raised a regiment, Lord Dongan’s Dragoons, in support of James II during the Williamite War in Ireland. He attended the brief Patriot Parliament summoned by James in 1689. Following the Battle of the Boyne, Dongan fled to France in the Flight of the Wild Geese and he was attainted in 1691. His estate, amounting to 3,000 acres, was granted to Godert de Ginkel, 1st Earl of Athlone; a grant later revoked by the English Parliament. Dongan died in exile in France in 1698. 

He had married Euphemia Maria, daughter of Sir Richard Chamber, in Spain. Their only son, Walter Dungan, Viscount Dungan, was killed while fighting for the Jacobites at the Battle of Boyne. Consequently, Dongan was succeeded in his titles by his younger brother, Thomas Dongan.

References

|-

|-

1630 births
1698 deaths
17th-century Irish people
1
Irish expatriates in France
Irish Jacobites
Members of the Irish House of Lords
Members of the Privy Council of Ireland
Peers of Ireland created by Charles II
People convicted under a bill of attainder
Wild Geese (soldiers)